Autovía de la Alcarria will be a dual carriageway in Spain that will connect Guadalajara and Tarancón.

Autopistas and autovías in Spain